Night of the Werewolf is the 59th title of the Hardy Boys Mystery Stories, written by Franklin W. Dixon. It was published by Wanderer Books in 1979 and by Grosset & Dunlap in 2005.

Plot summary
When a ferocious, wolf-life creature appears in the small town of Bayport on the night of a full moon, the Hardy boys are engaged to clear the name of a young man who has a history of werewolves in his family line is suspected.  Joe barely escapes a horrible death as the young detectives solve this exciting and hair-raising mystery.

Notes
The original 1979 Wanderer text (and the 2005 Grosset & Dunlap printings) have the Native American servant named Pocahontas.  For the Minstrel books from 1987–1996 the character's name was changed to Elizabeth.

The Hardy Boys books
1979 American novels
1979 children's books
Werewolf novels